The Lesser Nogai Horde, not to be confused with the (Greater) Nogai Horde on the Caspian, 
was the Nogai Tatar territory in Kuban (on the eastern shore of the Sea of Azov), allied with the Crimean Khanate, during the 16th and 17th centuries.

The horde was also known simply as Nogai Tatars.

See also
Crimean-Nogai raids into East Slavic lands
Little Tartary
greater Nogai Horde

External links
 Nogai Tatars at the Encyclopedia of Ukraine

Crimean Khanate
Turkic dynasties
Tatar states